.stw may refer to:
NeoOffice#Word processor application
OpenOffice.org XML#File formats